Krakatoa, East of Java is a 1968 American disaster film starring Maximilian Schell and Brian Keith. During the 1970s, the film was re-released under the title Volcano. The story is loosely based on events surrounding the 1883 eruption of the volcano on the island of Krakatoa, with the characters engaged in the recovery of a cargo of pearls from a shipwreck perilously close to the volcano. The film was nominated for the Academy Award for Best Special Visual Effects.

Krakatoa is actually west of Java, but the movie's producers thought that "East" sounded more atmospheric.

Plot
In 1883, the volcano on the island of Krakatoa in the Netherlands East Indies begins to erupt, terrorizing the children at a mission school in Palembang on nearby Sumatra.

Meanwhile, across the Sunda Strait at her homeport of Anjer on the west coast of Java, the steamer Batavia Queen, under the command of Captain Chris Hanson, takes aboard passengers and cargo, including a diving bell and a balloon. Among the passengers coming aboard are Douglas Rigby, the designer, owner, and operator of the diving bell; Giovanni Borghese and his son Leoncavallo, who own and operate the balloon as "The Flying Borgheses"; Harry Connerly, a diver; Connerly's mistress Charley Adams, who is a professional singer — a soprano, as she likes to point out to people — and former saloon hostess; four female Japanese pearl divers led by Toshi; and Laura Travis, a married woman who had an extramarital affair with Hanson in Batavia.

Laura was married to an abusive man with whom she had a son named Peter. Her husband did not want the marriage and threatened to take Peter away from her if she asked for a divorce. Wanting to be with Hanson, she had asked for a divorce anyway, and her husband had left her, taking both Peter and a fortune in pearls with him aboard the steamer Arianna. The Arianna had sunk off Krakatoa during a storm, and a guilt-ridden Laura, fearing that Peter had died aboard the Arianna and blaming herself for his death, had spent a year in a mental institution before coming aboard the Batavia Queen.

Hanson has organized the Batavia Queens voyage to find the wreck of the Arianna, salvage the pearls, and determine Peter's fate — and to find Peter if he is still alive. Hanson plans to use a variety of techniques to search for the wreck and salvage the pearls, with the Borgheses' balloon conducting an aerial search of shallow waters around Krakatoa, the pearl divers providing a mobile underwater search-and-salvage capability in shallow waters, Rigby in his diving bell searching in deeper water, and Connerly responsible both for recovering the pearls if they are in waters too deep for the pearl divers and for assisting in the heavy work of bringing the Ariannas safe to the surface. Colonial authorities arrive just before the Batavia Queen departs and force Hanson to take 30 convicts and their jailer aboard for transportation to Madura Island, countering his argument that the ship is not equipped to accommodate them and has no room for them by telling him to transport the prisoners in the ship's hold in appalling conditions. Hanson plans to deliver the convicts to Madura after recovering the pearls off Krakatoa.  One of the prisoners, Lester Danzig, is an acquaintance of Hanson's, and Hanson allows him to make the voyage on deck instead of in the hold. Aware that Krakatoa has begun to erupt and warned by a colonial official that the island is a "raging volcano", Hanson replies that the volcano had been quiet for the previous 200 years and posed no threat now.

During the Batavia Queens voyage to Krakatoa, her crew and passengers observe strange phenomena: They see seabirds swarming in huge flocks by day, witness a series of fiery explosions erupting from the sea one evening, and hear a high-pitched, ear-splitting hissing and whistling sound like that of escaping steam on another night. During a conversation on deck one night, Danzig discovers that Connerly is using laudanum to kill the pain of a lung disease which he is keeping secret from Hanson because it might interfere with his diving abilities. Danzig informs Connerly of Laura's time in the mental institution, calling into question the veracity of her story about the pearls. The Borgheses, Connerly, Charley, Rigby, and Toshi confront Hanson about Laura's mental state, but Hanson assures them that Laura's story about the Arianna is true. Connerly takes so much laudanum that he hallucinates one night, attacks one of the pearl divers, and assaults several crewmen coming to her aid before they can subdue him. On Hanson's orders, the Batavia Queens crew suspends Connerly in a slatted box above the main deck so that he will pose no danger to others aboard the ship; Charley tearfully pleads with Hanson for Connerly's release, and Hanson relents and frees him. Meanwhile, Leoncavallo and Toshi take a romantic interest in one another.

The Batavia Queen arrives off Krakatoa to find the island shrouded in thick smoke. It clears when she anchors off the island, and the Borgheses ascend in their balloon while Rigby descends in his diving bell. The Borgheses quickly discover the wreck of the Arianna and guide the Batavia Queen and the submerged Rigby to it. Immediately afterwards, the motor driving the propeller that allows them to steer their balloon fails and they careen helplessly over Krakatoa and into its active crater. They jettison the useless engine and propeller into the crater's lava lake to reduce weight and finally are blown clear of the crater by a volcanic explosion which sets their balloon afire. They drift away from the island, leap into the sea, and are rescued, but the fire destroys the balloon.

Danzig tells Hanson of Connerly's lung problems, and Hanson decides that he will dive on the Arianna instead of Connerly. While Connerly and Hanson argue over this, Rigby's diving bell becomes snagged on coral. The pearl divers, Hanson, and Connerly all dive into the water to free Rigby, and while they and the Batavia Queens other passengers and crew are thus occupied, Danzig steals a pistol he finds in the ship's chart room, knocks the jailer unconscious, and frees the prisoners. They take over the ship, throw the unconscious jailer overboard to drown, and imprison the passengers and crew in the hold, where they also place Rigby and the pearl divers when they return to the Batavia Queen. Before returning, and unaware of the turn of events aboard the Batavia Queen, Hanson and Connerly swim to the wreck of the Arianna, find the ship's safe, and attach a cable to it to have it hoisted aboard the Batavia Queen. Upon their return, Danzig has Connerly lowered into the hold but forces Hanson to look on at gunpoint as he opens the Ariannas safe on the Batavia Queens deck. They find nothing in the safe but a cheap pocket watch. When an explosion on Krakatoa distracts Danzig, Hanson overpowers him, takes the pistol from him, pushes the heavy safe over onto one convict, shoots two others, and uses steam from a hose to force the rest of the prisoners to jump overboard. They swim to nearby Krakatoa, never to be seen again.

After Hanson frees the passengers and crew from the hold, Rigby finds another compartment in the safe which contains the Ariannas logbook. Laura and Hanson examine the logbook for clues about Peter's fate. The logbook reveals that the Arianna made a last port call at Palembang before sinking, and a letter tucked into the logbook says that Peter disembarked there to attend the mission school. Hanson decides to steam to Palembang to find Peter. By now, Krakatoa is erupting continually, and the volcano's explosions begin to hurl lava bombs into the surrounding sea. A number of them strike the Batavia Queen as she gets underway for Palembang, starting fires which the crew puts out. As Toshi runs across the deck toward Leoncavallo, one of the lava bombs strikes and kills her.

The Batavia Queen arrives off Palembang to find the mission school heavily damaged, burning, and abandoned. Hanson hails a passing junk, and someone aboard the junk tells him that the school's staff and students are all alive and had fled Palembang that morning aboard another boat, intending to sail to Java. The Batavia Queen soon comes to the assistance of an overcrowded and sinking sampan, which proves to be the school's boat. The Batavia Queens passengers and crew rescue everyone aboard the sampan, including Peter, who has a joyful reunion with Laura. A chest belonging to Peter comes aboard the Batavia Queen during the rescue; it contains the pearls, and Connerly, Rigby, the Borgheses, and the three surviving pearl divers receive their shares of the fortune.

Krakatoa's violent explosions become larger and continuous; Hanson assumes that they will generate a tsunami and begins to prepare the Batavia Queen to ride it out. Although Hanson assures him that a tsunami will destroy nearby Anjer and that he is safer at sea aboard the Batavia Queen if she can get to deep water in time, Connerly disputes the ship's ability to survive and demands that Hanson allow those who wish to go ashore to row to Anjer with him in one of the ship's lifeboats. Giovanni Borghese, Charley, and the three surviving pearl divers join Connerly in the lifeboat and row to Anjer.

Krakatoa disintegrates in one final, cataclysmic explosion, which generates an enormous tsunami. It strikes Anjer shortly after the Batavia Queens lifeboat arrives there; unable to outrun the wave, Connerly and Charley embrace for the last time before the wave engulfs and kills them. At sea, Hanson, Laura, Peter, Rigby, Leoncavallo Borghese, the refugees from the mission school, and the ship's crew ride out the tsunami successfully aboard the Batavia Queen.

Cast 
(as given in end credits)
 Maximilian Schell as Captain Chris Hanson
 Diane Baker as Laura Travis
 Brian Keith as Harry Connerly 
 Barbara Werle as Charley Adams
 Sal Mineo as Leoncavallo Borghese
 Rossano Brazzi as Giovanni Borghese
 John Leyton as Dr. Douglas Rigby
 J.D. Cannon as Lester Danzig
 Jacqui Chan as Toshi
 Rob't Hall as Guard [spelled "Robert" in opening credits]
 Victoria Young as Kiko
 Marc Lawrence as Mr. Jacobs (First Mate)
 Midori Arimoto as Midori
 Niall Macginnis as Harbor Master (David)
 Joseph Hann as Mr. Kuan (Second Mate)
 Sumi Haru as Sumi
 Geoffrey Holder as Sailor
 Alan Hoskins as Jan
 Peter Kowalski as Peter Travis

Additionally, Peter Graves is listed in the opening credits.

Production

Development
In February 1955 Philip Yordan announced he would write and produce a film of the Krakatoa eruption with a budget of US$2 million to US$3 million being spent on special effects. It was going to be the first film made under Yordan's contract with Columbia Pictures. Jerry Wald would be executive producer. It took a number of years for the movie to be made, and in the meantime Yordan started making movies in Spain. In January 1967 he said he intended to film background footage for the movie in Indonesia and wanted Rock Hudson to star.

In February 1967 Milo Frank arrived in Madrid to begin supervising production of the film. Bernard L. Kowalski was attached to direct; Kowalski was best known for his television work, including the pilots for Mission Impossible, The Rat Patrol, The Monroes, and N.Y.P.D.. The director said "That seemed to impress the Cinerama people who were looking for a young director who could handle what looked to be a pretty difficult picture." The script was co-written by Bernard Gordon, a blacklisted writer who did a number of scripts for Yordan under pseudonyms.

Special effects
In an unusual approach to making the film, the producers of Krakatoa, East of Java had the special effects scenes shot before the script had been completed. The script then was written so as to incorporate the special effects sequences.

The French film director, art director, production designer, set designer, and screenwriter Eugène Lourié had worked for the film's producers as art and special-effects director for the 1965 movie Crack in the World, and they hired him to create the special effects for Krakatoa, East of Java.

In 1965, Lourié scouted the coast of Spain for a suitable steamer for use in the film as the fictional Batavia Queen; ultimately he chose a cargo ship – a former passenger-cargo ship employed as a tramp steamer between Spain and Morocco – he found unloading coal at a pier in Bilbao whose captain said she had been built in England sometime around 1880.

Lourié had the steamer remodeled in Málaga, Spain, at a shipyard which transformed her into the Batavia Queen by increasing the height of her funnel and masts and installing new yards on her masts and a new bowsprit and carved wooden figurehead on her bow. The steamer also was provided with functioning sails for her masts and yards.

The latter proved too small to provide realistic effects, so Lourié chose not to use it in the film, instead using only the larger model.

After considering a water tank in Malta, Lourié chose the water tank he had used for the 1964 film Flight from Ashiya at Cinecittà in Rome to film special effects sequences depicting the Batavia Queen at sea. The sequences were filmed using three Super Panavision 70 cameras running at three times normal speed to make the movements of the miniatures more realistic, although the cameras were not designed for such work and often overheated and required repairs. Lourié tried to disguise the miniature Batavia Queens lack of a crew or passengers as she gets underway for Palembang, slowly picking her way through a narrow passage under a rain of lava bombs while Krakatoa erupts nearby, by enveloping her in smoke. For the final sequence in which the Batavia Queen rides out a very large tsunami at sea, Lourié's team spent three days filming the model in the water tank in extreme conditions, creating large waves through the use of  dump tanks with a capacity of 2,600 gallons (9,800 liters), spraying water into the tank with powerful fire hoses, and employing a wind machine to disturb the water's surface.

For sequences in which live actors are seen against a village in the background, the film employed traveling mattes in the foreground and miniatures in the background.

Alex Weldon created the pyrotechnic sequences of Krakatoa erupting and, eventually, exploding. Scenes of the volcano erupting in the distance were created using a split screen, with real footage of the ocean in the lower part of the frame and a flopped volcano miniature reflection added above it in an optical printer.

The visual effects, relying entirely on in-camera model work, are still impressive today and considered an immense achievement by 1969 standards, enough so for it to be nominated for the Academy Award for Best Visual Effects. It lost to Marooned.

Lourié himself makes a non-speaking cameo appearance in Krakatoa, East of Java, portraying a lighthouse keeper on the coast of Java who observes Krakatoa's final, cataclysmic explosion and enters the lighthouse to send news of it by telegraph.

Yordan's departure
In addition to its challenging special effects, the makers of Krakatoa, East of Java encountered various difficulties during the film's production. Producer Philip Yordan dropped out of the production after its special effects had already been shot, and a new associate producer came on board who commissioned a new script.

These changes in leadership led to conceptual changes that created some inconsistency in tone and odd moments in the finished film. While apparently conceiving Krakatoa, East of Java overall as a family-friendly adventure story, the producers also opted to attract a more adult audience by including some sordid and racy elements: the tortured relationship between Connerly and Charley and Laura's extramarital affair with Hanson, as well as a striptease Charley performs for Connerly in their state room.

At other times, the film's soundtrack is clumsily incorporated into the narrative: while performing her striptease, Charley sings a rendition of "A Nice Old-Fashioned Girl" that would be appropriate in a musical but seems strangely out of place in an adventure or disaster film, and the vocal version of the film's romantic theme song "East of Java" incongruously plays during scenes of filthy prisoners shuffling into the Batavia Queens hold and sweating sailors performing the labor necessary to get the ship out to sea as she begins her voyage from Anjer.

Kowalski said "We had more than our share of problems because you can't control such varying conditions as weather, sea, children and animals.  But nearly everyone bore up under very trying circumstances. My life was only threatened four times."

Kowalski added that "the tendency in Cinerama has been to employ wide-angle shots that show everybody in the scene. I'm not doing that. I'm cutting quickly from one shot to another so things happen. I'm also devoting much care to the characters. I think if you have a bunch of people that the audience cares about, then you can build up the big scenic effects with no difficulty."

Title
During production of Krakatoa, East of Java, its producers became aware that Krakatoa is, in fact, west of Java – and east of Sumatra. (Mount Tambora, on Sumbawa, much less well known than Krakatoa despite its own – and even larger – cataclysmic explosion in 1815, is the violent volcano east of Java.) Despite the geographic error in the film's title, its makers chose to leave it unchanged, apparently believing that it was a more exotic title than Krakatoa, West of Java. Furthermore, the film aided in popularizing the spelling "Krakatoa", as opposed to the Indonesian spelling "Krakatau".

Film format
Krakatoa, East of Java was filmed in Super Panavision 70 (with some scenes filmed in Todd-AO), and presented in 70 mm Cinerama in some cinemas. Appearing in cinemas as interest in Cinerama's widescreen format waned, it is the only disaster movie ever to appear in the format.

Novelization
Michael Avallone wrote a novelization of the movie with the same title.

Historical inaccuracy

The catastrophic 1883 eruption of Krakatoa destroyed most of the uninhabited island and generated tsunamis exceeding 30 meters (100 feet) in height that struck the western coast of Java and southern coast of Sumatra, killing about 35,000 people, while a pyroclastic flow from the volcano that traveled across the Sunda Strait killed about another 1,000 people on Sumatra. Krakatoa, East of Java is only very loosely based on the actual events surrounding the eruption, which it uses merely as a backdrop for its storyline.

Hanson's statement early in the film that Krakatoa had been quiet for 200 years is accurate – the last eruption prior to 1883 appears to have been in 1680 – and his view that the ongoing volcanic activity on the island, which had begun in May 1883, did not pose a threat to anyone not actually on Krakatoa itself reflected the attitude of many people in the area during the summer of 1883, some of whom treated the erupting volcano as a tourist attraction.

Krakatoa is actually located west, not east, of Java.

The Batavia Queen appears to require at least three days to make the voyage from Anjer to Krakatoa.

Late in the film, when the Batavia Queen arrives off Palembang in search of Peter Travis, Palembang appears to be along the coast of Sumatra; however, Palembang, while accessible to ships via the Musi River, lies well inland. The Batavia Queen finds the mission school in ruins and ablaze because of Krakatoa's eruption; although Krakatoa's eruption was audible in Palembang and the air pressure wave from its final explosion was strong enough to shake the walls of houses and cause cracks to appear in some, the town did not suffer the serious damage implied by the condition of the mission school in the film.<ref>[https://books.google.com/books?id=OXcCAAAAIAAJ&q=Palembang%20Krakatoa&pg=PA12  Nature: A Weekly Illustrated Journal of Science], Vol. XXX: May 1884 to October 1884, New York: McMillan, 1884, p. 12.</ref>

The violent and continuous explosions on Krakatoa as the Batavia Queen steams from Krakatoa to Palembang and then to the vicinity of Anjer late in the film appear to depict the final, cataclysmic eruption of the volcano on 26–27 August 1883.

While the Batavia Queen, her passengers and crew, and the story of her voyage are entirely fictitious, her experience in encountering the tsunami at sea at the end of the film bears a striking resemblance to that of the interisland steamer Gouverneur-Generaal Loudon, which rode out a very large tsunami while steaming in the Sunda Strait on the morning of 27 August 1883.

The film's depiction of the salvage participants dividing up the pearls among themselves is legally flawed. The pearls are not found on the wreck; they are later located in the possession of Laura's son. Nevertheless, the salvage partners divide the treasure equally. According to maritime law, the pearls are not salvage and are the legal property of the boy. The salvage partners have no right to the pearls.

Critical receptionKrakatoa, East of Java was commercially unsuccessful and received generally poor reviews, with critics claiming that the story was pedestrian, badly paced, and poorly told, and the special effects so constant and overwhelming as to become numbing. The geographic error in the film's title of placing the doomed island east of Java was widely mocked in the reviews.

However, a few critics declared the film enjoyable and a vivid depiction of exotic places and life at sea. The Los Angeles Times called it "one of the best movies ever made in Cinerama ... Excellent in all aspects, it is an artistic as well as a cinematic triumph."

Later releases
Reprocessed in "Feelarama", a version of the then-popular Sensurround, the movie was re-released under the title Volcano during the 1970s.

Although it originally had a running time of 127 minutes (not counting overture, intermission, and exit music included in the 1969 theatrical release), the movie has often been seen since then on television and in 16 mm prints in a truncated 101-minute version, with some scenes shortened or deleted. In the 101-minute version, the sequences showing key passengers arriving aboard the Batavia Queen at Anjer and the voyage of the Batavia Queens lifeboat to Anjer are shortened, while the opening sequence showing terrified children at the mission school in Palembang, Charley's song and striptease for Connerly in their stateroom, and Charley's tearful pleas to Hanson to have Connerly set free from the box suspended above the Batavia Queen's deck are missing.

Home mediaKrakatoa, East of Java was released by MGM Home Video on March 22, 2005, as a Region 1 widescreen DVD.

In popular cultureKrakatoa, East of Javas storyline bears many similarities to that of the 1953 film Fair Wind to Java starring Fred MacMurray, which tells the story of a race between an American sea captain and an Indonesian pirate leader to recover a legendary fortune in diamonds from Krakatoa in 1883 just before the island explodes.

In the episode "Someone to Watch Over Me" of the series Frasier, one of the titles between sections reads "KRAKATOA, WEST OF JAVA (THE MOVIE WAS WRONG)".

The film is mentioned by Jerry Seinfeld in the Seinfeld episode "The Truth": "Those brave Krakatoans, east of Java, who sacrificed so much for so long!"

It is parodied in the Monty Python sketch "Scott of the Antarctic" as "Krakatoa, East of Leamington".

In the final episode of Eerie, Indiana, one character can be heard saying on the phone, "Who cares if Krakatoa isn't really east of Java?", referring to getting a bad grade on a test.Krakatoa, East of Java was the first film that British film critic Mark Kermode ever saw.

The phrase "Krakatoa, east of Java" is used in the lyrics to the 1979 song "Lava" by The B-52's, included in their first album The B-52's: "My heart's crackin' like a Krakatoa. Krakatoa, east of Java, molten bodies, fiery lava."  It also appears in the song "New World Disorder" by Biohazard, from the album of the same name.

The film is mentioned in the Wings episode "Just Say No". When Brian jokes that if his date the previous night had been a movie, "waves would be crashing, rockets would be launching, and volcanoes would be erupting," Lowell replies, "I've seen that movie: Krakatoa, East of Java. There wasn't much sex, but nobody had any time."

In 1982 the French group Indochine wrote the song, À l'est de Java, narrating the story of the movie. The lyrics were written by Nicola Sirkis and the music was composed by Dominik Nicolas.

An exterior shot of the Cinerama Dome in the 2019 film Once Upon a Time in Hollywood depicts the theater in 1969 advertising Krakatoa, East of Java. The recreated vintage posters were left on the theater's exterior as part of Once Upon a Time in Hollywood'''s 70mm engagement there.

See also
 List of American films of 1968

Notes

References

External links

Photo gallery of models, miniatures, and special effects used in Krakatoa, East of Java and Eugène Lourié's account of filming the special effects sequences at Model Ships in the Cinema

1969 films
1960s disaster films
American disaster films
Films scored by Frank De Vol
Films set in Indonesia
Films directed by Bernard L. Kowalski
Krakatoa
Seafaring films
Films about volcanoes
Films set in 1883
1960s historical drama films
American historical drama films
Cinerama Releasing Corporation films
1883 eruption of Krakatoa
1960s English-language films
1960s American films